Lovekiller may refer to:

Lovekiller (album), a 2010 album by Swedish singer Darin
"Lovekiller" (song), title track taken from the album above
"Love Killer", a song by The Killer Barbies from their 1995 album Dressed to Kiss